Sanjiang originally and typically refers to the Three Parallel Rivers of southwestern China: the Jinsha (upper Yangtze), the Lancang (Mekong), and the Nu (Salween).

It may also refer to:
Sanjiang Dong Autonomous County, Guangxi
Sanjiang College, Nanjing
Sanjiang Plain, in eastern Heilongjiang north of the Changbai Mountains and east of the Lesser Khingan

Subdistricts
Sanjiang Subdistrict, Chongqing, in Qijiang District
Sanjiang Subdistrict, Guiyang, in Xiaohe District, Guiyang, Guizhou
Sanjiang Subdistrict, Jinhua, in Wucheng District, Jinhua, Zhejiang
Sanjiang Subdistrict, Shengzhou, Zhejiang
Sanjiang Subdistrict, Yongjia County, Zhejiang

Towns
Sanjiang, Daozhen County (Daozhen Gelao and Miao Autonomous County), Guizhou
Sanjiang, Qiandongnan, in Jinping County, Guizhou
Sanjiang, Jiangmen, Guangdong
Sanjiang, Liannan County (Liannan Yao Autonomous County), Guangdong
Sanjiang, Hainan, in Meilan District, Haikou
Sanjiang, Miluo (三江镇), a town in Miluo City, Hunan province
 Sanjiang, Xupu (三江镇), a town of Xupu County, Hunan
Sanjiang, Nanchang County, Jiangxi
Sanjiang, Bazhong, in Bazhou District, Bazhong, Sichuan
Sanjiang, Chongzhou, Sichuan
Sanjiang, Jingyan County, Sichuan
Sanjiang, Wangcang County, Sichuan

Townships
Sanjiang Township, Gongcheng County (Gongcheng Yao Autonomous County), Guangxi
Sanjiang Township, Jinxiu County (Jinxiu Yao Autonomous County), Guangxi
Sanjiang Township, Jiangxi, in Nankang, Jiangxi
Sanjiang Township, Sichuan, in Wenchuan County
Sanjiang Sui Ethnic Township, Rongjiang County, Guizhou

Other
Sanjiang Church, church in Wenzhou, China